Koh-Lanta is a French reality game show based on the popular international Survivor format. The series premiered on August 4, 2001. The show is broadcast on TF1 and there have been 22 regular seasons and 7 special seasons. The show has been hosted by Denis Brogniart since the second season. The title of the show Thai "Ko Lanta" (roughly translated as "the island of a million eyes") - not only is this a reference to the televised nature of the competition (with millions of viewers watching the show) but the title is also the name of filming location of the first season (Ko Lanta Yai, Thailand).

Following the basic premise of other international versions of the Survivor format, it features a group of contestants who are marooned in an isolated location, where they must provide food, water, fire, and shelter for themselves. The contestants compete in challenges for rewards and immunity from elimination. The contestants are progressively eliminated from the game as they are voted out by their fellow contestants until only one remains and is declared the winner and awarded the grand prize of €100,000. 
Since its debut in 2001, Koh-Lanta has been a huge success in France, regularly finishing first in its timeslot.

Format and rules

The show follows the same general format as the other editions of the show. The players are split between two "tribes", are taken to a remote isolated location and are forced to live off the land with meagre supplies for approximately 6 weeks (3 weeks in special seasons). Frequent physical and mental challenges are used to pit the teams against each other for rewards, such as food or luxuries, or for "immunity", forcing the other tribe to attend "Tribal Council", where they must vote off one of their players.

Once about half the players are remaining, the tribes are merged into a single tribe, and competitions are on an individual basis; winning immunity prevents that player from being voted out. Most players that are voted out at this stage form the "Tribal Council Jury". Once down to two people, a final Tribal Council is held where the remaining players plead their case to the jury as to why they should win the game. The jury then decides who between the two should be considered the winner and be awarded the grand prize of €100,000, with the runner-up being awarded €10,000.

Differences in format
Unlike most versions of Survivor, dual winners are possible in some seasons where the jury vote resulted in a tie (as occurred in Koh-Lanta: Bocas del Toro, Koh-Lanta: Palawan and Koh-Lanta: The Cursed Totem). In this case both contestants are considered the winners and each receive  €55,000. This differs from most editions of the show as other editions will either never have a jury with an even number of participants or have tie-breaker mechanisms in place (such as Israeli Survivor where the tie will break in favor of the winner of a public vote or in Dutch/Belgian's Expeditie Robinson where a group of former players form a "grand jury" and vote to break the tie).

Another difference in rules between Koh-Lanta and other editions is how the unexpected eliminations are handled. On Koh-Lanta, when a player is eliminated from the game outside of "Tribal Council" (either by being removed for medical reasons, or quitting prior to Raja Ampat), the player is replaced by the most recently eliminated player (or, if no such player is available, by a completely new contestant), who will take their place and the game continues as planned. In other editions, an unexpected elimination is handled by adjusting the events of the game to accommodate the absence of a player (often the upcoming Tribal Council will be cancelled but this will not always be the case).

Seasons

Controversy

Season 5 controversy 

During the broadcast of the second episode (July 8, 2005 in France and July 10, 2005 in New Caledonia), participants had to kill and cook Puffinus pacificus, a species of fully protected bird in New Caledonia. This caused that several spectators demanded explanations to the TF1 channel. TF1 responded that according to the LPO (in English, League for the Protection of Birds), Puffinus pacificus are not a protected species. LPO asked the CSA (broadcasting regulator in France) to take up the case, and the latter also decided to initiate legal action against TF1 and the producer of the Adventure Line Productions program.

The petition against the production company was accepted, therefore TF1 was ordered to pay the LPO €1,000 in damages and €2,000 for procedural expenses, while the TF1 channel lawsuit against the LPO was rejected.

Season 13 cancellation
Production for the 2013 season was cancelled following the death of a contestant, Gérald Babin, during the first day of filming in Cambodia on 22 March 2013. The program's on-site doctor, Thierry Costa, committed suicide following the controversy. Production later resumed for Koh-Lanta: The New Edition.

The death of Babin marked the second death of a contestant on any edition of Survivor worldwide. The first (and so far only other) death occurred on the 4th season of Bulgarian Survivor (titled Survivor BG: Philippines) when contestant Noncho Vodenicharov died, however unlike Koh-Lanta the production of the series continued.

Season 19 cancellation
On 11 May 2018, TF1 and the production company Adventure Line Productions (ALP) announced the cancellation of the season following an alleged sexual assault.

See also
 List of French adaptations of television series from other countries

References

External links
 (Official Site) 

 
2001 French television series debuts
TF1 original programming
French reality television series